(−)-endo-fenchol dehydrogenase (l-endo-fenchol dehydrogenase, FDH) is an enzyme with systematic name (−)-endo-fenchol:NAD(P)+ oxidoreductase. This enzyme catalyses the following chemical reaction

 (−)-endo-fenchol + NAD(P)+  (+)-fenchone + NAD(P)H + H+

This enzyme is from the plant Foeniculum vulgare.

References 

EC 1.1.1